Plasmaticus is a monotypic moth genus of the family Noctuidae. Its only species, Plasmaticus angulata, is known from New Guinea. Both the genus and species were first described by George Thomas Bethune-Baker in 1906.

References

Catocalinae
Monotypic moth genera